1980–81 Division 1 was the 43rd season of the French top association football league, played from July 1980 to June 1981. The league was won by AS Saint-Etienne with 57 points, for whom this was their 10th title.

Participating teams

 Angers SCO
 Auxerre
 SEC Bastia
 Bordeaux
 Stade Lavallois
 RC Lens
 Lille
 Olympique Lyonnais
 FC Metz
 AS Monaco
 AS Nancy
 FC Nantes Atlantique
 OGC Nice
 Nîmes Olympique
 Paris Saint-Germain FC
 AS Saint-Etienne
 FC Sochaux
 RC Strasbourg
 FC Tours
 US Valenciennes-Anzin

League table

Promoted from Division 2, who will play in Division 1 season 1981/1982
 Stade Brest:Champion of Division 2, winner of Division 2 group B
 Montpellier HSC:Runner-up, winner of Division 2 group A

Results

Relegation play-offs

|}

Top goalscorers

References

 Division 1 season 1980-1981 at pari-et-gagne.com

Ligue 1 seasons
France
1